This is a List of lesbian-themed fiction. It includes books from the 18th century through the 21st century. It also includes lists of works by genre, a list of characters that make recurring appearances in fiction series, and a list of lesbian and feminist publishing houses.

Fiction and drama (2nd century)
Dialogues of the Courtesans, Lucian of Samosata

Fiction and drama (18th century)
Fanny Hill, John Cleland (1748) – Fanny has an encounter with Phoebe, a prostitute
La Religieuse, Denis Diderot (1796) – a Reverend Mother wants to seduce a nun

Fiction and drama (19th century)
Mademoiselle Maupin, Théophile Gautier (1835)
Carmilla, Sheridan Le Fanu (1872)
Der Liebe Lust und Leid der Frau zur Frau (1895) – the only known exemplar is in the Berlin State Library (RVKO number Yx 27911).
Nana, Émile Zola (1880), – an extended description of Chez Laure, a Parisian restaurant that caters to a lesbian clientele; the relationship of Nana and the unfaithful Satin, "with her blue eyes and schoolgirlish look", "bitten and beaten and torn this way and that by the two women".
Mademoiselle Giraud, My Wife, Adolphe Belot (1891)
鳳雙飛 (Feng shuangfei) (A Pair of Male Phoenixes Flying Together), Cheng Huiying (程蕙英) (1899)

Fiction and drama (20th century)
Sind es Frauen? Roman über das dritte Geschlecht., Minna Wettstein-Adelt (1901)
Thirty-Three Abominations, Lydia Zinovieva-Annibal (1907)
The Rainbow, D. H. Lawrence (1915)
花物語 (Hana Monogatari, "Flower Tales") (short stories), Nobuko Yoshiya (1916-1925)
Regiment of Women, Winifred Ashton (under the pseudonym Clemence Dane) (1917)
The Scorpion, Anna Elisabet Weirauch (1919) (1930) (1931)
屋根裏の二處女 (Yaneura no Nishojo, "Two Virgins in the Attic"), Nobuko Yoshiya (1920)
The Bachelor Girl, Victor Margueritte (1922)
God of Vengeance (play), Sholem Asch (1923) – a girl has a lesbian relationship with a prostitute
Freundinnen, Maximiliane Ackers (1923)
Anja und Esther (play), Klaus Mann (1925)
The Captive (play), Edouard Bourdet (1926) – tragedy of a young woman who falls into a twisted relationship with another woman
The Well of Loneliness, Radclyffe Hall (1928) – subject of an obscenity trial that banned the book in the United Kingdom until 1949, though "there are no descriptions of sex in it, no rude words, and the lesbian lovers do not live happily ever after"
Ladies Almanack, Djuna Barnes (1928)
Orlando: A Biography, Virginia Woolf (1928)
Extraordinary Women, Compton Mackenzie (1928)
Kariera Nikodema Dyzmy by Tadeusz Dołęga-Mostowicz has a lesbian character having an affair with her father's wife. The wife eventually marries the main character, but there is no question of the lesbian feeling any sentiments towards a man.
The Autobiography of Alice B. Toklas, Gertrude Stein (1933) – one of Stein's more accessible works. Others, whose lesbian content may not be apparent to the uninformed reader, include As a Wife Has a Cow: A Love Story, Lifting Belly, and Miss Furr and Miss Skeene.
The Child Manuela, Christa Winsloe (1933)
The Children's Hour (play), Lillian Hellman (1934)
Nightwood, Djuna Barnes (1936)
Lulu, Alban Berg (1937)
Young Man with a Horn, Dorothy Baker (1938) – Amy has a relationship with the singer Josephine Jordan
Torchlight to Valhalla, Gale Wilhelm (1938)
The Friendly Young Ladies, Mary Renault (1943)
Two Serious Ladies, Jane Bowles (1943)
No Exit, Jean-Paul Sartre (1944) – Inès Serrano, a lesbian, is sent to Hell for murder
Women's Barracks, Tereska Torres (1950) – credited as the first US paperback-original bestseller
Spring Fire, Marijane Meaker (as Vin Packer) (1952)
Le Rempart des Béguines, Françoise Mallet-Joris (1952) – Helene, a 15-year-old schoolgirl, is seduced by her father's mistress, Tamara
The Price of Salt, Patricia Highsmith (under the pseudonym "Claire Morgan" before 1990) (1952) – considered the first lesbian novel with a 'happy ending'; basis for the 2015 film Carol.
Chocolates for Breakfast, Pamela Moore (1956) – portrays the bond between the protagonist Courtney Farrell and her boarding school teacher Miss Rosen, and the backlash against them from other teachers and students
Odd Girl Out, I Am a Woman, Women in the Shadows, Journey to a Woman, and Beebo Brinker (a.k.a. The Beebo Brinker Chronicles), Ann Bannon (1957–1962)
The Girls in 3-B, Valerie Taylor (1959)
Cassandra at the Wedding, Dorothy Baker (1962)
The Group, Mary McCarthy (1962)
Winter Love, Han Suyin (1962)
The Killing of Sister George, Frank Marcus (1963) – basis for the 1968 film The Killing of Sister George (1968)
Desert of the Heart, Jane Rule (1964) – basis for the 1985 film Desert Hearts
From Doon with Death, Ruth Rendell (1964)
The Microcosm, Maureen Duffy (1966)
A Compass Error, Sybille Bedford (1968)
Patience and Sarah, Isabel Miller (1969)
Rubyfruit Jungle, (1973), Rita Mae Brown
Lover (1976), Bertha Harris
The Color Purple (1982), Alice Walker
Toothpick House (1983), Lee Lynch
Oranges Are Not the Only Fruit (1985), Jeanette Winterson
Mousson de femmes (Monsoon of Women) (1985), Elula Perrin
The Swashbuckler (1985), Lee Lynch
Lesbian Body (1986), Monique Wittig
Say Jesus and Come to Me (1986), Ann Allen Shockley
Memory Board (1987), Jane Rule
July Nights and Other Stories, (1991), Jane Eaton Hamilton
Send My Roots Rain (1991), Ibis Gómez-Vega
Six of One (1991), Rita Mae Brown
Aquamarine (1993), Carol Anshaw
Bastard Out of Carolina (1993), Dorothy Allison
Stone Butch Blues (1993), Leslie Feinberg
Chelsea Girls (1994), Eileen Myles
Empire of Dreams (1994), Giannina Braschi
Written on the Body (1994), Jeanette Winterson
Flashpoint (1995), Katherine V. Forrest
Along the Journey River (1996), Carole LaFavor
Fall on Your Knees (1996), Ann-Marie MacDonald
Memory Mambo (1996), Achy Obejas
Living at Night (1997), Mariana Romo-Carmona
Sweet Bitter Love (1997), Rita Schiano
Loving Her (1997), Ann Allen Shockley
The Passion (1997), Jeanette Winterson
Working Parts (1997), Lucy Jane Bledsoe
Hood (1998), Emma Donoghue
Coachella (1998), Sheila Ortiz Taylor
Like (1998), Ali Smith
Kissing the Witch (1999), Emma Donoghue

Fiction and drama (21st century)
High Art (2000) Tanya Dolan
Stirfry (2000), Emma Donoghue
Tipping the Velvet (2000), Sarah Waters
Gun Shy (2001), Lori L. Lake
Fingersmith (2002), Sarah Waters
Affinity (2002), Sarah Waters
Hotel World (2002), Ali Smith
Love Ruins Everything (2002), Aren X. Tulchinsky
The Wanderground (2002), Sally Miller Gearhart
Hunger (2002), Jane Eaton Hamilton
Garis Tepi Seorang Lesbian (2003), Herlinatiens
Love and Other Ruins (2003), Aren X. Tulchinsky
Maybe Next Time (2003), Karin Kallmaker
Southland (2003), Nina Revoyr
Crybaby Butch (2004), Judith Frank
Love's Masquerade (2004), Radclyffe
Under the Witness Tree (2004), Marianne K. Martin
Desert Blood (2005), Alicia Gaspar de Alba
Bliss (2005), Fiona Zedde
The Five Books of Moses Lapinsky (2005), Aren X. Tulchinsky
Life Mask (2005), Emma Donoghue
Back Talk (2006), Saxon BennettFrench Postcards (2006), Jane MerchantFresh Tracks (2006), Georgia BeersIdaho Code (2006), Joan OpyrOf Drag Kings and the Wheel of Fate (2006), Susan "Smitty" SmithPunk Like Me (2006), JD GlassSnow Moon Rising (2006), Lori L. LakeThe Night Watch (2006), Sarah WatersA Taste of Sin (2006), Fiona ZeddeEvery Dark Desire (2007), Fiona ZeddeFlight Risk (2007), Kim BaldwinA Girl Named Charlie Lester (2007), Carissa HalstonSuch A Pretty Face (2007), Gabrielle GoldsbyThe Teahouse Fire (2007), Ellis AveryAmong Other Things, I've Taken Up Smoking (2008), Aoibheann SweeneyBeyond the Pale (2008), Elana DykewomonHungry for It (2008), Fiona ZeddeLanding (2008), Emma DonoghueRelief (2008), L.E. ButlerYour Sad Eyes and Unforgettable Mouth (2008), Edeet RavelCat Rising (2009), Cynn ChadwickGirl Meets Boy (2009), Ali SmithLesbians Roaring Like A Tsunami (2010), by Mikhail VolokhovUn Soir du Paris (2010), short story collectionBroken Ladder", (2010), J. Monique Gambles
Buyer's Remorse (2011), Lori L. Lake
Cinnamon (2012), Samar Yazbek
Like Dark Minds (2013), Christy Summerland
Ghostwriter (2012), Terry Birchwood
Tipping Over (2013), Terry Birchwood
Bury Me When I'm Dead: A Charlie Mack Motown Mystery (2016), Cheryl A Head
Weekend (2016), Jane Eaton Hamilton
Y Not, She Meowed (2017), Robby S. Witt
Death's Echoies (2018), Penny Mickelbury
Paper is White (2018), Hilary Zaid
Great America (2020), Clayton Overstreet
Between A Rock and A Soft Place: Selected Works (2021), S. Renee Bess

Mystery series by lead character
Alison Kaine, a lesbian police officer in Denver, Colorado, in mysteries by Kate Allan
Allison O'Neill, a lesbian in mysteries by Lauren Wright Douglas
Amanda Valentine, a lesbian detective inspector in Wellington, New Zealand, in mysteries by Rose Beecham
Wilhelmina "Bil" Hardy, an amateur lesbian detective in Idaho Code and From Hell to Breakfast by Joan Opyr
Brenda Strange, a private investigator of the weird in Tampa, Florida, in mysteries by Patty Henderson
Brett Higgins, a gangster/private investigator in Detroit, Michigan, in mysteries by Therese Szymanski
Caitlin Reece, a lesbian in mysteries by Lauren Wright Douglas
Carmen Ramirez, a 24-year-old Irish-Puerto Rican lesbian copy editor at her hometown newspaper in Frontier City, Oklahoma in mysteries by Lisa Haddock
Carol Ashton, a lesbian detective inspector in Sydney, Australia in mysteries by Claire McNab
Cassandra Reilly, a widely traveled lesbian translator in mysteries by Barbara Wilson
Cassidy James, a lesbian private investigator based in Portland, Oregon, in mysteries by Kate Calloway
Colleen Fitzgerald, a lesbian insurance investigator in mysteries by Barbara Johnson
Danielle Renaud, a lesbian French-Canadian RCMP officer in mysteries by Nadine LaPierre
Desiree "Dez" Reilly, a lesbian policewoman in St. Paul, Minnesota, in mysteries by Lori L. Lake
Emma Victor, a lesbian private investigator in San Francisco, California, in mysteries by Mary Wings
Fleur de Roller, an undercover security agent who falls for her subject in The Woman Who Pretended To Love Men (Those Strange Women #2) by Anna Ferrara
Gianna Maglione, lesbian police lieutenant in Washington, D.C., in mysteries by Penny Mickelbury
Hilary Tamar (?), an androgynous lawyer in mysteries by Sarah Caudwell; in fact, Caudwell never specifies Tamar's sex
Hyacinth Dickinson a lesbian gynecologist and diamond smuggler in Newcastle upon Tyne by Ellen Dean
Jane Lawless, a lesbian restaurant owner and private investigator in Minneapolis in mysteries by Ellen Hart
Jet Butler, a lesbian college professor in mysteries by B. Reese Johnson
Jo Jacuzzo, a charismatic lesbian in Buffalo, New York, in mysteries by Anne Seale
Jude Devine, a lesbian sheriff's detective in Montezuma County, Colorado, in mysteries by Rose Beecham
Kate Delafield, a lesbian LAPD homicide detective and former Marine in mysteries by Katherine V. Forrest
Kate Martinelli, a lesbian homicide detective in San Francisco in mysteries by Laurie R. King
Kristin Ashe, a lesbian private investigator in mysteries by Jennifer L. Jordan
Kellen Stewart, a therapist and a lesbian in Great Britain by Manda Scott
Kylie Kendall, the lesbian manager of a pub in tiny Wollegudgerie, Australia who inherits 51% of her father's private detective agency in Los Angeles, California, in mysteries by Claire McNab
Lane Thompson, a charming lesbian patient at the Wonderdrug Psychiatric Center in The Woman Who Made Me Feel Strange (Those Strange Women #1) by Anna Ferrara
Lauren Laurano, a lesbian private investigator in Manhattan in mysteries by Sandra Scoppettone
Leona 'Leo' Reese, a lesbian police officer/fraud investigator in Portland, Oregon by Lori L. Lake
Lexy Hyatt, a lesbian crime reporter in Florida in mysteries by Carlene Miller
Lindsay Gordon, a lesbian journalist and socialist in Glasgow, Scotland, in mysteries by Val McDermid
Maggie Garrett, a young, lesbian private investigator in San Francisco in mysteries by Jean Taylor
Maris Middleton, a lesbian chemist with a specialization in forensics in mysteries by Kaye Davis
Meg Lacey, a lesbian private investigator based in Canada in mysteries by Elizabeth Bowers
Rainey Blue Bell, an FBI agent on medical leave and a bail bonds business owner; meets her first lesbian lover in Rainey Days, the first novel in the Rainey Bell mystery series by R.E. Bradshaw
Micky Knight, a lesbian private investigator in New Orleans in mysteries by J.M. Redmann
Monette O'Reilley, a towering lesbian, the star player of the Leaping Lesbians of the Park Slope soccer team, and a graphic artist in New York City in mysteries by David Stukas
Nea Fox, a lesbian private investigator in London, England in mysteries by Amelia Ellis
Nickel (Nicole) Smith, a lesbian small-town newspaper editor in Runnymeade by Rita Mae Brown
Pam Nilsen, lesbian printing company owner in Seattle, Washington, by Barbara Wilson
Saz Martin, a lesbian private investigator in London by Stella Duffy
Shay O'Hanlon, a lesbian coffee store owner in the humorous caper/mysteries by Jessie Chandler
Stoner McTavish, a lesbian travel agent in Boston, Massachusetts, by Sarah Dreher
Sydney Sloan, a lesbian private investigator in New York, New York, in the Stonewall Inn mysteries by Randye Lordon
Toni Mendez, a lesbian private investigator in London by Sam Skyborne
Toni Barston, a lesbian district attorney specializing in borderline personalities in mysteries by Terri Breneman
Tru North, a lesbian police detective in Kansas City, Missouri, in mysteries by Janet McClellan
Virginia Kelly, a lesbian investment adviser in mysteries by Nikki Baker

Romance novels
La Fille aux yeux d'or – Honoré de Balzac
The Interpretation of Love and the Truth – Barbara Winkes
It's Complicated:Misconceptions – Erika Renee Land
Owning Regina – Lorelei Elstrom
Curious Wine, Emergence of Green – Katherine V. Forrest
All True Lovers, Cytherea's Breath, Amantha – Sarah Aldridge
Legacy of Love, Love in the Balance, Dawn of the Dance, Never Ending, Mirrors, Under the Witness Tree, Dance in the Key of Love – Marianne K. Martin
Mulligan, House on Sandstone, Just this Once, Secrets So Deep, Out of Love – KG MacGregor
Sunset Island, Awaiting My Assignment, The Interim, Anything Your Heart Desires – AJ Adaire
Beyond Midnight, Beautiful Strangers (Hyacinth Dickinson Series) – Ellen Dean
Honor Series, Justice Series, Provincetown Series – Radclyffe
All the Wrong Places, Car Pool, Embrace in Motion, Finders Keepers, In Every Port, Just LIke That, The Kiss that Counted, One Degree of Separation, Painted Moon, Sugar, Unforgettable, Making Up For Lost Time, Substitute for Love, Touchwood, Wild Things, Watermark (the last the sequel to Touchwood) – Karin Kallmaker
Course of Action, Coffee Sonata, Sheridan's Fate, September canvass – Gun Brooke
Define Destiny JM Dragon
First Instinct, Forever Found, Rising Storm, Hotel Liaison – J. Lee Meyer
More Than Paradise, the Moon Island Series: Passion Bay, Saving Grace, The Sacred Shore, A Guarded Heart, and the Dark Vista series: Dark Dreamer, Dark Valentine – Jennifer Fulton
I Found My Heart In San Francisco Series, Arbor Vitae – SX Meagher
Sweet Bitter Love – Rita Schiano
Sierra City, Gulf Breeze, Hunter's Way, Behind the Pine Curtain, Coyote Sky, Dawn of Change, The Rainbow Cedar, One Summer Night – Gerri Hill
The Light Fantastic – L A Tucker
Never Say Never, Class Reunion – Linda Hill
None So Blind, Prairie Fire, Tumbleweed Fever – LJ Maas
Galveston 1900: Swept Away, The Bluest Eyes in Texas, and Borderline – Linda Crist
The Price of Fame, The Cost of Commitment, The Value of Valor – Lynn Ames
The Price of Salt – Patricia Highsmith (originally under the pseudonym "Claire Morgan")
Infinite Loop – Meghan O'Brien
Innocent Hearts, Love's Melody Lost, Love's Tender Warriors, Tomorrow's Promise, Passion's Bright Fury, Love's Masquerade – Radclyffe
Hunter's Pursuit, Force of Nature, Whitewater Rendezvous, Focus of Desire – Kim Baldwin
A Gift of Time, Gloria's Inn – Robin Alexander
Private Dancer – TJ Vertigo
96 Hours, Turning the Page, Thy Neighbor's Wife, Too Close to Touch, Fresh Tracks, Mine, Starting from Scratch – Georgia Beers
Turning Point – Lara Zielinsky
Such A Pretty Face – Gabrielle Goldsby
Trails Merge, Learning Curve – Rachel Spangler
On the Air – Geonn Cannon
Gemini – Geonn Cannon
Out on the Sound, The Girl Back Home, Sweet Carolina Girls – R.E. Bradshaw
Zen and Tonic – Kris Howard (2011)
Like Lovers Do, Different Dress, Ricochet in Time – Lori L. Lake
As You Were – Kelli Jae Baeli
Broken Star – Joann Lee
Aspen's Stunt – Melissa Grace
Double Shot, Mile High Club, Switching Teams, Girlfriends With Benefits, Sugar in the Morning, Velvet Canyon, Care by Kera, Broken Wing, Commando Jane – Ella Wrylee
Heart of the Hurricane – May Woodworth 1920's female bisexual couple Eliza and Joanna survive the August gales of Nova Scotia and find love

Historical novels
Vulture's Kiss, Sistine Heresy, Mephisto Aria – Justine Saracen
 Miss McGhee – Bett Norris
 The Seahawk – Brenda Adcock
 Snow Moon Rising – Lori L. Lake
 What's Best for Jane – Bett Norris
 When Women Were Warriors – Catherine M. Wilson
Branded Ann – Merry Shannon
Heart of the Hurricane – May Woodworth
In The Blood of The Greeks – Mary D. Brooks
Where Shadows Linger – Mary D. Brooks
Hidden Truths – Mary D. Brooks
 Snow White and Her Queen – Anna Ferrara

Science fiction, fantasy, and horror

These science fiction works frequently address the issue of feminist/lesbian separatist communities. See Lesbian science fiction for a more detailed review.

 Joanna Russ's The Female Man
 Marion Zimmer Bradley's Renunciate series
 Jane Fletcher's Celaeno series
 Katherine V. Forrest's Daughters of a Coral Dawn, Daughters of an Amber Noon, Daughters of an Emerald Dusk, and Dreams and Swords, an anthology with the novella O Captain, My Captain
 Jewelle Gomez's The Gilda Stories, Don't Explain
 Nicola Griffith's Ammonite and Slow River
 Patrick Califia's Doc and Fluff
 Therese Szymanski's Call of the Dark anthology
 Karin Kallmaker, Barbara Johnson, Julia Watts and Therese Szymanski's New Exploits books, including Once Upon a Dyke, Bell, Book & Dyke, Stake Through the Heart, and Tall in the Saddle
 Diana River's Hadra series
 Laurie J. Marks's Dancing Jack, Elemental series (Fire Logic, Earth Logic, Water Logic)
 Meghan O'Brien's The Three and Wild
 Pam Keesey's Daughters of Darkness and Dark Angels
 Gun Brooke's Supreme Constellations series
 Benjamin Appleby-Dean's Lamplight
 Moondancer Drake's Ancestral Magic
 Justine Saracen's The 100th Generation and Vulture's Kiss''''
 Libba Bray's characters Felicity Worthington and Pippa Cross in her Gemma Doyle trilogy (A Great and Terrible Beauty, Rebel Angels, and The Sweet Far Thing) are at first thought to be very close friends, almost sisters, until it is revealed they are harboring a secret love for one another
 Catherine M. Wilson's When Women Were Warriors series: Book 1: The Warrior's Path, 2: A Journey of the Heart, and 3: A Hero's Tale Malinda Lo's Ash and Huntress Women on the Edge of Space, a space-opera anthology published by Circlet Press
 Gay male author Geoff Ryman's Arthur C. Clarke Award-winning The Child Garden features a lesbian protagonist
 Sam Skyborne's Simulation: The Dawn of a Superhero.
 Sarah Diemer's The Dark Wife Raven c.s. McCracken's It's Always Spring Break Somewhere in the Galaxy J.A. Pitts's Black Blade Blues, Honeyed Words, and Forged in Fire L.J. Baker's Broken Wings, Promises, Promises, and Adijan and the Genie Gill McKnight's Garoul series: Goldenseal,Ambereye, and Indigo Moon Merry Shannon's Sword of the Guardian Allison Moon's "Tales of the Pack" series of novels including Lunatic Fringe and Hungry Ghost Melissa Grace's Tainted Elite Young adult fiction Ruby (1976), Rosa GuyHappy Endings Are All Alike (1978), Sandra ScoppettoneThe Last of Eden (1980), Stephanie TolanCrush (1981), Jane FutcherAnnie on My Mind (1982), Nancy GardenDeath Wore a Diadem (1989), Iona McGregorGood Moon Rising (1996), Nancy GardenThe House You Pass on the Way (1997), Jacqueline WoodsonThe Year of Freaking Out (1997), Sarah WalkerDare Truth or Promise (1997), Paula BoockAllison (1998), Tatiana StrelkoffGirl Walking Backwards (1998), Bett WilliamsSummer Sisters (1998), Judy BlumeTomorrow Wendy (1998), Shelley StoehrOut of the Shadows (2000), Sue HinesA Year of Full Moons (2000), Madelyn ArnoldEmpress of the World (2001), Sara RyanFinding H.F. (2001), Julia WattsGravel Queen (2003), Tea BenduhnI've Known Since I Was Eight (2003), Sophie GlasserKeeping You a Secret (2003), Julie Anne PetersKissing Kate (2003), Lauren MyracleThe Bermudez Triangle (2004), Maureen JohnsonGood Girls Don't (2004), Claire HennessyHeart (2004), Lexi HarrisOrphea Proud (2004), Sharon Dennis WyethRosemary and Juliet (2004), Judy MacLeanSugar Rush (2004), Julie BurchillFar from Xanadu (2005), Julie Anne PetersThe Will of the Empress (2005), Tamora Piercegrl2grl (2007), Julie Anne PetersThe Rules for Hearts (2007), Sara RyanSplit Screen (2007), Brent HartingerAlix & Valérie (2008), Íngrid DíazDown to the Bone (2008), Mayra Lazara DoleM+O 4Ever (2008), Tonya Cherie HegaminMy Tiki Girl (2008), Jennifer McMahonPretty Little Liars (2008–present), Sara ShepardThe Girl from Mars (Marsmädchen) (2008), Tamara BachThe Questions Within (2008), Teresa ShaefferRage: A Love Story (2009), Julie Anne PetersAsh (2009), Malinda LoI Kiss Girls (2007), Gina HarrisTorn (2009), Amber LehmanThe Dark Wife (2011), Sarah DiemerThe Miseducation of Cameron Post (2012), Emily DanforthCandlelight (2013), Sara C. RoethleAfterworlds (2014), Scott WesterfieldUnspeakable (2015), Abbie Rushton

Fan fiction

Fanfiction writers have produced many works in which female characters from fictional sources (such as television shows, movies, video games, anime, manga or comic books) are paired in romantic, spiritual, or sexual relationships. The genre is known by a variety of terms, including femslash, saffic, yuri and f/f slash. Lesbian content in fanfiction dates at least to 1977, but has become more popular during the 1990s and 2000s.

Lesbian and feminist publishing houses
Alyson Books
Aunt Lute Books
AUSXIP Publishing
Bella Books
Blue Feather Books
Bold Strokes Books
Bywater Books
Colbere Publishing
Crossing Press
Dukebox.life
Desert Palm Press
Firebrand Books
Intaglio Publications
Kitchen Table: Women of Color Press
Launch Point Press
Onlywomen Press
Press Gang Publishers
Regal Crest Enterprises
Spinsters Ink
Supposed Crimes
Virago Press
Ylva Publishing

Further reading
 The Lesbian in Literature by Gene Damon (Barbara Grier) – bibliography of any title with lesbian content through 1969
 Chloe plus Olivia – An Anthology of Lesbian Literature from the Seventeenth Century to the Present, ed. Lillian Faderman, Penguin Books 1995

See also

Lesbian literature
Lesbian pulp fiction
Lesbian teen fiction
LGBT literature
List of genres
List of nonfiction books about homosexuality
List of poetry portraying sexual relations between women
Yuri (genre)

References

Potter, Clare. The Lesbian Periodical Index, Naiad Press 1986 
Gay detectives listed by Stop, You're Killing Me!, a resource for mysteries
Gay & Lesbian detectives listed by Martin Kich
Lesbian (Feminist) Los Angeles, 1970–1990: An Exploratory Ethnohistory, Yolanda Retter University of New Mexico
McCormick Library of Special Collections, Northwestern University LibraryLas Tortilleras: Tortilleras: Hispanic and U.S. Latina Lesbian Expression, edited by Inmaculada Perpetusa-Seva and Lourdes Torres, Temple University Press 2003These Girls Are Not Sweet'', edited by Marjorie Agosin, White Pine Press 2000

External links
Feminist SFF & Utopia: Dyke Protagonists
Science Fiction for Lesbians
GLBTQ – Novel: Lesbian
GLBTQ – American Literature: Lesbian, Post-Stonewall
QueerTheory – Contemporary Lesbian Writers of the USA
Lesbian Mysteries features lesbian mystery novels

 
Fiction

Bibliographies of subcultures